Mount Victoria is a mountain located above Queens Reach of Jervis Inlet within the Pacific Ranges of the Coast Mountains of British Columbia Canada.  The mountain was named during the 1860 survey by  who charted all of the known area and named the mountain after Princess Beatrice Mary Victoria "baby" who was the ninth child of Queen Victoria and Prince Albert.

The first ascent of Mount Victoria was made in 1931 by Arthur Tinniswood Dalton and Percy Williams Easthope.

References

External links
 CM_C2308 Fraser River to N.E.Pt. of Texada Island including Howe Sound and Jervis Inlet 'Annotated'  1863.02.16 1865.08
 Detail Map of Mount Victoria from the 1860 Survey Map of the Jervis Inlet and Mt.Victoria.

Two-thousanders of British Columbia
Pacific Ranges
Lillooet Land District